The following is a list of events relating to organized crime in 1884.

Events
"Yellow" Henry Stewart and three gang members are convicted of armed robbery and imprisoned. Stewart later dies in prison of malaria in 1886.
Johnny Torrio emigrates with his mother Maria Carlucci Torrio to the United States arriving in New York from Osara, Italy.
March 1 – Two members of the Whyos, recently sentenced to six months imprisonment for vagrancy, escape from Hart's Island after swimming to a boat anchored in the Sound. Suspicious of the circumstances surrounding their escape, two prison guards are dismissed from their posts.
June 4 – The body of George Leonidas Leslie, a.k.a. George Howard, former leader of the Leslie Gang, is found by an NYPD Mounted Patrolman at the bottom of Tramps' Rock on the border of Westchester County and the Bronx River. 
July 22 – New York fence Marm Mandelbaum is charged with several counts of grand larceny and receiving stolen goods by the recently appointed District Attorney Peter B. Olney. While the trial was scheduled in December, Mandelbaum skipped bail, fleeing to Canada where she would reside for the rest of her life.
October 21 – James Reilly, along with his Whyos accomplices John Belfield and James Brown, are tried and convicted of assaulting and robbing an Englishman, Henry Stanley, of $26 after Reilly lured him to a Pell Street saloon.
October 26 – Suspected members of the Mulberry Street Gang including James McCardell, John Lary, Charles McManus and ex-con George Lee are taken into custody by police officers of the Sixth Precinct Station House after August Lenk and John Burke reported being assaulted on the corner of Grand and Mulberry Streets by unidentified assailants who stole their gold watches. During their trial at the Tombs Police Court One of those charged, James McCardell, was identified by Lenk as one of his attackers while Burke claimed to recognize George Lee as the who had distracted him while the other two men attacked. McCardell is held in custody at $1,000 bail, the others were remanded.
December 25 – Dennis Cocoran, formerly of the New Orleans City Hall Department of Improvements and leader of the Poydras Market Gang, stabbed Deputy Sheriff Daniel Haugherty on the corner of Poydras and Liberty Streets after an altercation only hours before. Taken to Charity Hospital, he died of his wounds at around one o'clock the following morning.

Births
October 1 – Damon Runyon (Alfred Damon Runyon), Organized crime writer
November 19 – Joseph Ardizzone, Los Angeles crime family, Boss

References

Organized crime
Years in organized crime